Atanasije Stojković (September 20, 1773 in Ruma, Austrian Empire – September 25, 1832 in Kharkov, Imperial Russia) was a Serbian, Austrian and Russian writer, pedagogue, scholar, physicist, mathematician and astronomer of Serb origin. He is considered as the finder of the Russian meteoritics. Stojković was the president of the  Imperial University of Kharkov from 1807 to 1809 and from 1811 to 1813.

Early life and education 
Stojković was born in Ruma, then part of the Austrian Empire (now modern day Serbia) on 20 September 1773. He finished grammar school in his native village of Ruma in Srem. From 1789 to 1794 he attended the École polytechnique at Buda and afterwards, till 1798, the University of Göttingen. His education (at Buda and Göttingen) was funded by the Metropolitan of the Serbian Orthodox Church at Sremski Karlovci -- Stevan Stratimirović—and subsequently in Sremski Karlovci itself, where Stojković proposed to take orders. Upon graduation and on returning home, however, he abandoned the idea in favor of his academic and scientific careers. It was during his studies at the University of Budapest, where he was inspired by lectures and it was there that he determined to devote himself to natural science, mathematics, physics and astronomy.

He received PhD at the University of Göttingen where he also graduated. Stojković took his undergraduate degree in philosophy in 1796, and for a time pursued the study of philosophy and natural science at the University of Göttingen. He graduated in 1798 with a PhD in Philosophy and Natural Science. He became a member of the Mineralogical Society in Jena. Mainly through the influence of Dositej Obradović he turned his attention to literature and science, and during the years 1801 and 1804 made a special study of astronomy.

It was during his university days that he began his researches in physics which led to his great treatise on that subject. This work—Fizika—was published in 1801-1804 in three volumes. This work entitled Stojković to rank as one of the greatest of those who took part in the development of early modern physics of which Gottfried Wilhelm Leibniz was the founding father along with Kepler, Galileo, and others, before him. It also added credibility to Vuk Karadžić's reforms. Stojković wrote the three-volume tome with the common man in mind, using the vernacular idiom rather than the antiquated.

From Professor to Rector
Severyn Osipović Potocki secured him in 1799 as professor of physics—its first—at the Imperial University of Kharkov (1805-1813) and within a short period he became a member of the Russian Academy of Sciences and served as the university's rector (1807-1808 and 1811-1813). He was already acquainted with Pierre Charles Le Monnier and his son-in-law, Joseph-Louis Lagrange, a member of the French Academy of Sciences, which had become part of the Institut de France (1795) and through their work in astronomy Stojković decided to make Meteor Science his life's work. As a member of the newly instituted commission of education at the new university, he rendered invaluable service to his adopted country (Imperial Russia) for the next several years.

From 1821 until 1829 he was a professor of geology at St. Petersburg and he corresponded with members of the Geological Society of France (1830) and influenced the work of the next generation of geologists, Ami Boué (1794-1881), Gerard Paul Deshayes (1795-1875) and Jules Desnoyers (1800-1887). Before Charles Lyell (1797-1875), Stojković advocated a study of the causes or forces now in action in order to illustrate the past.
 
In 1824 a new version of the New Testament appeared in modern Serbian vernacular. This was translated by Atanasije Stojković, and was issued in Cyrillic character by the Russian Bible Society at Petrovgrad (St. Peterburg).
 
Stojković was known in Imperial Russia, Austrian and Ottoman empires as one of the most enlightened and zealous teachers of the time. As professor of physics, and regent of schools, Stojković was the ornament of the University of Kharkov during the time he was there. He published improved editions of several scholastical and philological works. He wrote books in Russian on the foundation of physics and physical astronomy,.

In Krasnoyarsk Krai, Russia, where the Tunguska event on 30 June 1908 took place, a hill is named after Atanasije Stojković. Teodor Pavlović (1804-1854) wrote and published a detailed biography of Atanasije Stojković, Russian Emperor's Governmental Counselor.

Published works 
It was during his university days that he began his researches in physics which led to his great treatise on that subject. This work—Fizika—was published in 1801-1804 in three volumes. This work entitled Stojković to rank as one of the greatest of those who took part in the development of early modern physics of which Leibnitz was the founding father along with Kepler, Galileo, and others, before him. It also added credibility to Vuk Karadžić's reforms. Stojković wrote the three-volume tome with the common man in mind, using the vernacular idiom rather than the antiquated.

In 1800, Stojković's first Serbian novel Kandor or Revelation of Egyptian mysteries shows the clear influences of 18th century Egyptomany—such as was mostly fostered by Karl von Eckartshausen and by Freemasonry and other similar societies.

He was author of the first Serbian language book about physics and member of the Göttingen Academy of Sciences and Humanities. The first book presented to the library of Matica Srpska were presented by Stojković.

In his literature works he used Slavonic-Serbian language and belongs to the group of authors who brought German version of Enlightenment to Serbs. After completing his education Stojković moved to Kharkov, Russia. He died in Kharkov on 2 June 1832. While in Imperial Russia, he held the position of Russian-Emperor's Governmental Counselor. His treatise on Physics (Fizika) and New Testament translation were written in the Slavoserbian vernacular and not the Serbo-Slavonic language of the chancellery and private correspondences of the late eighteenth and early nineteenth century.

Stojković was awarded the Order of Saint Vladimir.

 Selected works 
 Kandor ili Otkrovenie Egipetskih Tainih'' (Kandor, or a Revelation of Egyptian Mysteries, 1800)

See also
 Gligorije Trlajić
 Teodor Filipović
 Vasily Karazin
 Andrej Dudrovich

References

Sources

External links 
 Mad scientist, text about Atanasije Stojković published at B92 website

Further reading 
 

1773 births
1832 deaths
People from Ruma
University of Göttingen alumni
Habsburg Serbs
Serbian educators
Serbian writers
People from the Russian Empire of Serbian descent